618 Elfriede is a minor planet orbiting the Sun. On July 24, 2013, it occulted the magnitude 12.8 star 2UCAC 23949304, over parts of Mexico and southwestern United States.

Photometric observations of this asteroid collected during 2008 show a rotation period of 14.85 ± 0.01 hours with a brightness variation of 0.12 ± 0.02 magnitude.

References

External links 
 Lightcurve plot of 618 Elfriede, Palmer Divide Observatory, B. D. Warner (2006)
 Asteroid Lightcurve Database (LCDB), query form (info )
 Dictionary of Minor Planet Names, Google books
 Discovery Circumstances: Numbered Minor Planets (1)-(5000) – Minor Planet Center
 
 

000618
000618
Discoveries by Karl Lohnert
Named minor planets
000618
19061017